James Blundell is the debut studio album by Australian recording artist James Blundell, released in 1989 by EMI. The album peaked at number 68 on the ARIA Albums Chart.
The album includes the singles "Cloncurry Cattle Song" and "Kimberly Moon" which won Blundell the Male Vocalist of the Year award at the Country Music Awards of Australia in 1989 and 1990.

Track listing

Charts

Release history

References

James Blundell (singer) albums
1989 debut albums
Albums produced by Garth Porter